This article covers all of the Teams events in the World Bridge Federation youth program—in principle including experimental or obsolete events for age-limited teams, which are not now part of WBF Youth Bridge.
World Junior Pairs Championship covers all of the Pairs and Individuals events.

The World Junior Teams Championship is a bridge competition for zonal teams of players up to about 25 years old.

Zonal signifies both organization by the World Bridge Federation (WBF) and qualification in eight WBF zones; for example (2006, 2008), six teams qualify from 'Europe' defined by European Bridge League membership. Zones may require national representation; for example, the six European teams must represent six member nations of the EBL.

The oldest event, sometimes called the Junior Teams without qualification, dates from 1987 with some changes in definition. Today that is the "open" u-26 tournament (Juniors) in contrast to the u-26 for women (Girls), the open u-21 (Youngsters) and the open u-16 (Kids). It has been held every two years, odd-number years to 2005 and even years from 2006. Competitors vie for the Ortiz-Patiño Trophy, formerly presented by WBF President Emeritus Jaime Ortiz-Patiño (1930–2013) who conceived the idea while serving as WBF President in 1985. The even-year tournaments officially constitute the World Youth Teams Championships for so-called juniors, girls, and youngsters. The entries are national teams, representing countries affiliated with the WBF via membership in the eight geographical "zonal organizations". Moreover, they must qualify within their zones, usually by high standing in a zonal championship tournament that is limited to one team per member nation.

The 2008 junior teams championships were part of the inaugural World Mind Sports Games in Beijing, China. Denmark won its second gold medal, beating Poland in the final, while Norway won the bronze. The 1st Games also included under-28 and under-21 team championships won by Norway and France. Under-21 and u-26 are part of the WBF youth program (namely, two of the three World Youth Teams Championships) but u-28 is not.

In 2010 Israel defeated France in the Juniors final while China won the bronze medal. The event was part of the newly christened World Bridge Series that also included World Young Ladies Teams and under-21 World Youngsters Teams, both won by Poland.

In 2011, at the 2nd World Youth Congress, "Ned Juniors" comprising four players from the Netherlands won the main teams event, a six-day tournament with 27 entries. Ned Juniors won the full-day 56-deal final by 131 to 60 IMPs against "Arg Uru" from Argentina and Uruguay. Meanwhile, "Ned Rum", with one Dutch pair and one transnational pair from Romania and the United States, won third place against "France".

Arg Uru led the preliminary round-robin from which eight teams advanced to full-day knockout matches, and its second-place finish matched that by Argentina in 1989, the best finish for any youth players from outside Europe and North America.

The Youth Congress in odd-number years is transnational: pairs and teams comprising players from different bridge nations are eligible to enter. Transnational teams finished second and third in the main event, but 23 of 27 entries have team names which imply nationality. Medal ceremonies raise the national flag and play the national anthem is the gold medal winner is national in composition.

Scope

The Junior Teams event (or tournament in a narrow sense) officially became part of the plural "World Youth Teams Championships" when a tournament for under-21 players was initiated. Beginning 2009, teams events were added to the WBF youth program for odd-number years, contested immediately prior to the older events for pairs in the newly christened "World Youth Congress".

Odd-year teams events are distinct from the older series of teams championships (now biennial in even years) and even-year pairs events are distinct from the older series of pairs championships (now biennial in odd years). Some conditions differ.

This article covers all "world championships" for youth teams while World Junior Pairs Championship covers all "world championships" for youth pairs or individuals.

Location
The Youth Teams series has moved around the world, with only one of the last 10 renditions in Europe. Meanwhile, all eight renditions (to 30 August 2011) now counted in the Youth Pairs series have been in Europe.

The distinct Youth Congress has been held 2009 in Turkey and 2011 in Croatia.

Results

The World Youth Teams Championships now comprise three concurrent events or flights: the original Juniors, the Youngsters from 2004, and the Girls from 2010. The latter are sometimes called "Schools" and "Young Ladies", as they were christened in Europe before adoption at the world level.

The Juniors format has evolved. Currently all three flights determine three medalists. They end with a knockout stage and a playoff between losing semifinalists; that is, two concluding matches determine first and third places.

Juniors
The Netherlands won the inaugural world championship for junior teams in 1987 and won the Bermuda Bowl in 1993 with three of the recent junior players: De Boer, Leufkens, and Westra. No other junior teams champions have so quickly won the Bermuda Bowl.

* Crozet in 1987, Pejacsevich–Rizzo in 1989, and C. Carmichael–Wiegand in 1999 did not play enough boards in order to qualify for second place
** Kühn–Pioch in 1993 and F. Di Bello–S. Di Bello in 1999 did not play enough boards in order to qualify for the title of World Champion

Youngsters

Girls

Kids

Koç University, host of the 2014 championships, sponsored an invitational tournament for "National Kids Teams" of players born 1999 and later (age 15 and under, roughly). Seven invitations were accepted: five from Europe including host Turkey, India from Asia & the Middle East, and China from Asia Pacific.

The Kids played  round-robin in three days with a four-team knockout, semifinals and finals, completed during the 5- and 6-day round-robin stages of the official events. France and Poland virtually tied the round robin (a margin less than 1/2 VP) and won the semifinals before Poland won the trophy over 42 deals. China beat Sweden in the third-place match. Meanwhile, India won a two-day, three-team contest for fifth place. 

Poland, France, India, China and the host were represented in all four tournaments.

Youth Congress 

The World Youth Congress is a distinct meet in odd years with transnational entries permitted in all teams and pairs events. It was inaugurated 2009 in Istanbul, Turkey; reiterated 2011 in Opatija, Croatia. The 2013 rendition in Atlanta, United States, is termed the "3rd World Youth Open Bridge Championships" as of August 2014.

40 teams entered the main event at the 1st World Youth Congress in 2009. At least two-thirds of the team names, and more among the strong performers, suggest a single nationality. "Japan Czech" won the final against "Italy Red" while "USA 1" won third place against "Netherlands Red". Evidently 8 teams advanced from preliminary play to knockout matches and there were no playoffs to distinguish any of the quarterfinal losers, 5th to 8th places.
(Some of the main events for teams at WBF meets are scheduled so that preliminary and quarterfinal losers are eligible to enter a secondary event that begins during the main event semifinals. For others only preliminary losers are available to enter the first stage of another event. For example, the 2nd World Youth Congress in 2011, the secondary BAM teams event was a consolation tournament initially among preliminary losers, the 9th to 27th place teams in the main prelim. Quarterfinal losers in the main event joined the consolation on its second day.)

27 teams entered at the 2nd Congress in 2011, all but four having team names that suggest a single nationality.

World Championships & Events (double overview). World Bridge Federation.
World Youth Congress. World Bridge Federation.

The World Youth Congress (to conclude 29 August 2011) will include "world championships" for teams, pairs, and individuals, each with Juniors and Youngsters flights if the number of u-21 entries is sufficient. There will also be secondary contests with alternative forms of scoring, board-a-match teams and IMP pairs(*).

Some of these events may officially continue "world championships" for junior players contested before 2009: miscellaneous ones, not those now held in even-number years: biennial (zonal) World Youth Teams Championships and quadrennial World Bridge Games.
For the World Bridge Games, among 96 junior pairs in the final and 30 in the consolation, the WBF lists 124 co-national pairs, one England–Wales (because the Olympic movement recognizes Great Britain teams?), and one Argentina–Chile (why?).

The 2011 events for teams and pairs will be transnational in that entries may comprise players from different countries and open in that there is no preliminary qualification at zonal level.

Here is a list of pertinent past championships.

Teams
2009 only(*), World Juniors Teams Championship to Date (Board-a-match), World Youth Congress. WBF.
2009 only, World Juniors Teams Championship to Date (Swiss), World Youth Congress. WBF.
2002 only, junior flight of the IOC Grand Prix

Pairs
2009 only(*), World Juniors IMP Pairs Championships to Date (IMPs), World Youth Congress. WBF.
2006 only, youngsters pairs World Youngsters Pairs Championship to Date, World Youth Congress. WBF.
1995-2009, every two/three years World Juniors MP Pairs Championships to Date (matchpoints), World Youth Congress. WBF.

Individuals
2000 only, junior flight of the World Masters Individual Championships, World Masters Individual. WBF.
2004 only, World Juniors Individual Championship to Date, World Youth Congress. WBF.

University students

"under the auspices of the FISU".World University Team Cup. WBF.

Teams comprise university student players from one nation, not one university.(2010 conditions)

Europe 1993 to 2001 (worldwide in 2000 and 2001)
1992 Antwerp World University Chess Championship, Lode Lambeets attended and initiated the same for bridge (2002)
1993 Antwerp, EBL President Paul Magerman
1994 DEN (2002)
1995
1996 NED (2008)
1997 NED
1998 DEN
1999 NED
Hagen of Denmark 2002 "He began in Palermo in 1997 and missed only the 1999 edition when he preferred to take part in the Junior World Championships being held in Florida at the same time." (2002)
2000
2001 NED

2005 NOR

2000 0826-0902 Maastricht, Netherlands
Bridge Olympiades (11th Olympiad)
1st World University Teams Bridge Cup (conditions): "Players must be students of a recognized University, between 17 and 28 years of age. Each country may enter one representative team."
24 entries; Austria, Italy, Denmark
Europe (16): 123456789 579 0234
21! rounds, first 7 of 14 days
Romania and Turkey listed 23/24 at WBFdatabase did not participate

2002 08 04/13 Bruges, Belgium
EBL from 199x, worldwide 2000, FISU 2002
13 entries: Denmark [1994, 1998], Italy, Netherlands [four recent] 
 Denmark, Italy, Netherlands, Poland
Europe (11): 12345689 11 12 13

2004 1031/1106 Istanbul, Turkey
alongside 12th Olympiad
15 entries; Poland, Belgium, USA
VP 284 276 247
Europe (12): 124689 012345
17 to 27 at beginning of year (may turn 28)
Anti-Doping, Open and Women only

2006 10-21/26 Tianjin, China
27 entries; China A, USA, Poland B; 
Europe (16): 2345678 123578 026
champion, Tianjin Normal University
contenders CHN 25:5 USA, USA 17:13 POL, POL 22:8 CHN
VP 508 492 472

2008 09 03/08 Łódź, Poland
21 entries; Netherlands A, Poland A, Norway A

first European (EUC) 1993 Antwerp, initiator Paul Magerman, son Geert M is now technical delegate FISU
Netherlands EUC champion 1996,97,99,01
Netherlands runaway Marion Michielsen–Meike Wortel, Bob Drijver–Merijn Groenenboom, Danny Molenaar–Tim Verbeek. 
three Bulletins only, evidently days 1 to 3
Europe:

2010 08-02/09 Kaohsiung, Taiwan
organized by FISU and the Chinese Taipei University Sports Federation (CTUSF); supervised and assisted by other Chinese Taipei bodies; conducted under WBF technical rules
round-robin teams-of-four; as many as two teams per nation, six players per team
citizens born 1982—1992 (up to 28 during calendar 2010)
current student registered in degree program or completed degree program preceding year
"For the purpose of opening and closing ceremonies, the participating delegations are requested to bring with them 2 national/regional flags (96 x 144cm) as duly registered with FISU."
14 entries; Poland, France, Israel
Poland in a runaway (11-1-1, average 21.3+ VP!); by IMPs the three Poland pairs ranked 1-2, 3-4 and 15-16 among all 73 participating players
USA B fourth but slaughtered by Poland, France, Israel (18 total; average 21 in other matches; 8-4-1)
Poland winner +31 VP before final round!
POL 276 FRA 238 ISR 232 
Europe (6): 12359 14

2012 07-10/15 Reims, France

See also
Bridge at the 1st World Mind Sports Games
World Junior Pairs Championship

Notes

References

External links
1st World Mind Sport Games contemporary coverage, 2008. World Bridge Federation
13th World Bridge Series contemporary coverage, 2010. WBF
Youth Bridge program overview at WBF
Youth Bridge — WBF Youth Committee website
University Bridge program overview at WBF
University Bridge in the World by Kuba Kasprzak

Junior Teams